Kristina Kovnir (born 26 September 1997) is a Russian sprint canoeist.

She competed at the 2021 ICF Canoe Sprint World Championships, winning a gold medal in the K-2 200 m distance.

References

External links

1997 births
Living people
Russian female canoeists
ICF Canoe Sprint World Championships medalists in kayak